Bugia may refer to:

 Béjaïa, a port city in Eastern Algeria near the mountains of Little Kabylia
 Bugia, the above city as Catholic titular see, concurrent with its authentic Roman name Saldae
 Béjaïa Province
 a candle, especially used as the name for an additional candle carried by a server standing beside a bishop at some Christian (particularly Roman Catholic) liturgical celebrations
La Bugia (the Candle), a book of verses, written in 1656  Massimiliano Palombara 

Catholic titular sees in Africa